Ojingeo-jeot or salted squid is a jeotgal (젓갈, salted seafood) made by salting and fermenting thinly sliced squid. It is a popular banchan (side dish) with high protein, vitamin and mineral contents.

Preparation 
Squid is skinned, gutted, washed, salted with coarse salt and let ferment for three to four days. It is then drained, salted again, and let age for three more days up to a month. Well fermented squid is washed, julienned into thin strips, and seasoned with gochutgaru (chili powder), mullyeot (rice syrup), aekjeot (fish sauce), chopped scallions, minced garlic, ground ginger, sliced chili peppers, toasted sesame seeds, and sesame oil.

Varieties 
In Jeju Island, mitre squid is used. As the squid is called hanchi or hanchi-ojingeo, the mitre squid jeotgal can also be called hanchi-jeot or hanchi-ojingeo-jeot.

In Japan, salted seafood category similar to jeotgal is called shiokara. Salted and fermented squid dish similar to ojingeo-jeot is called ika-no-shiokara in Japanese.

See also
Cantonese salted fish
Cured fish
Salted fish
Salted squid

References

Further reading 

 

Jeotgal
Squid dishes